Gollum is a fictional character in J. R. R. Tolkien's Middle-earth legendarium. He was introduced in the 1937 fantasy novel The Hobbit, and became important in its sequel, The Lord of the Rings. Gollum was a Stoor Hobbit of the River-folk who lived near the Gladden Fields. In The Lord of the Rings it is stated that he was originally known as Sméagol, corrupted by the One Ring, and later named Gollum after his habit of making "a horrible swallowing noise in his throat".

Sméagol obtained the Ring by murdering his relative Déagol, who found it in the River Anduin. Gollum referred to the Ring as "my precious" or "precious", and it extended his life far beyond natural limits. Centuries of the Ring's influence twisted Gollum's body and mind, and, by the time of the novels, he "loved and hated [the Ring], as he loved and hated himself." Throughout the story, Gollum was torn between his lust for the Ring and his desire to be free of it. Bilbo Baggins found the Ring and took it for his own, and Gollum afterwards pursued it for the rest of his life. Gollum finally seized the Ring from Frodo Baggins at the Cracks of Doom in Mount Doom in Mordor, but he fell into the fires of the volcano, where both he and the Ring were destroyed.

Commentators have described Gollum as a psychological shadow figure for Frodo and as an evil guide in contrast to the wizard Gandalf, the good guide. They have noted, too, that Gollum is not wholly evil, and that he has a part to play in the will of Eru Iluvatar, the omnipotent god of Middle-earth, necessary to the destruction of the Ring. For Gollum's literary origins, scholars have compared Gollum to the shrivelled hag Gagool in Rider Haggard's 1885 novel King Solomon's Mines and to the subterranean Morlocks in H. G. Wells's 1895 novel The Time Machine.

Gollum was voiced by Brother Theodore in Rankin-Bass's animated adaptations of The Hobbit and Return of the King, and by Peter Woodthorpe in Ralph Bakshi's animated film version and the BBC's 1981 radio adaptation of The Lord of the Rings. He was portrayed through motion capture by Andy Serkis in Peter Jackson's Lord of the Rings and The Hobbit film trilogies.

Name 

In Appendix F of The Lord of the Rings, the name "Sméagol" is said to be a "translation" of the Middle-earth name  (having to do with the idea of "burrowing"), and rendered with a name based on Old English  of similar meaning.

In Tolkien's Red Book of Westmarch, the name "Déagol" is supposedly a translation of the "original" name in the author-invented language of Westron, with the same meaning.

Appearances

The Hobbit 
Gollum was introduced in The Hobbit as "a small, slimy creature" who lived on a small island in an underground lake at the roots of the Misty Mountains. He survived on cave fish, which he caught from a small boat, and small goblins who strayed too far from the stronghold of the Great Goblin. Over the years, his eyes adapted to the dark and became "lamp-like", shining with a sickly pale light.

Bilbo Baggins stumbled upon Gollum's lair, having found the Ring in the network of goblin tunnels leading down to the lake. At his wits' end in the dark, Bilbo agreed to a riddle game with Gollum on the chance of being shown the way out of the mountains. In the first edition of The Hobbit, Gollum's size is not stated. Originally, he was also characterised as being less bound to the Ring than in later versions; he offered to give the Ring to Bilbo if he lost the riddle game, and he showed Bilbo the way out of the mountains after losing. To fit the concept of the ruling Ring that emerged during the writing of The Lord of the Rings, Tolkien revised later editions of The Hobbit. The version of the story given in the first edition became the lie that Bilbo made up to justify his possession of the Ring to the Dwarves and Gandalf.

In the new version, Gollum pretended that he would show Bilbo the way out if he lost the riddle-game, but he actually planned to use the Ring to kill and eat him. Discovering the Ring missing, he suddenly realised the answer to Bilbo's last riddle — "What have I got in my pocket?" — and flew into a rage. Bilbo inadvertently discovered the Ring's power of invisibility as he fled, allowing him to follow Gollum undetected to a back entrance of the caves. Gollum was convinced that Bilbo knew the way out all along, and hoped to intercept him near the entrance, lest the goblins apprehend Bilbo and find the Ring. Bilbo at first thought to kill Gollum in order to escape, but was overcome with pity, and so merely leaped over him. As Bilbo escaped, Gollum cried out, "Thief, Thief, Thief! Baggins! We hates it, we hates it, we hates it forever!"

The Lord of the Rings 

Gollum's real name was Sméagol, and he had once been a member of the secluded branch of the early Stoorish Hobbits. He spent the early years of his life with his extended family under a matriarch, his grandmother. On Sméagol's birthday, he and his relative Déagol went fishing in the Gladden Fields. There, Déagol found the Ring in the riverbed after being pulled into the water by a fish. Sméagol fell immediately under the Ring's influence and demanded it as a birthday present; when Déagol refused, Sméagol strangled him.

Sméagol later used the Ring for thieving, spying and antagonising his friends and relatives, who nicknamed him "Gollum" for the swallowing noise he made in his throat, until his grandmother disowned him. He wandered in the wilderness for a few years until he finally retreated to a deep cavern in the Misty Mountains. The Ring's malignant influence twisted his body and mind, and prolonged his life well beyond its natural limits.

Gollum left his cave in pursuit of Bilbo a few years after losing the Ring, but the trail was cold. He made his way to the edge of Mordor, where he met the monstrous spider Shelob and became her spy, worshipping her and bringing her food. He was eventually captured by Sauron's forces and tortured, revealing to Sauron the names of "Baggins" and "the Shire". His testimony alerted Sauron to the existence and significance of hobbits in general and the Baggins family in particular. He was freed, but was soon caught by Gandalf and Aragorn, who interrogated him about the Ring and placed him in the care of the Wood Elves of Mirkwood. He escaped from them (with the help of Sauron's Orcs) and descended into Moria.

Gollum began following the Fellowship of the Ring in Moria, but was noticed by Frodo Baggins, Gandalf, and Aragorn. He trailed the Fellowship to the edge of Lothlórien. He picked up their trail again as they left, following them all the way to Rauros, then pursued Frodo and Samwise Gamgee across the Emyn Muil when they struck out on their own towards Mordor.

Frodo and Sam confronted Gollum in the Emyn Muil; Gollum nearly strangled Sam, but Frodo subdued him with his Elvish sword, Sting, which had once belonged to Bilbo. Frodo tied an Elvish rope around Gollum's ankle as a leash, but the mere touch of the rope pained him. Taking pity on the wretched creature, just as Bilbo once had, Frodo made Gollum swear to help them. Agreeing to the oath, Gollum swore by the Ring itself, and Frodo released him. The unlikely company, guided by Gollum, made their way to the Black Gate, the main entrance to Mordor. Frodo's kindness brought out Gollum's better nature, and he made at least some effort to keep his promise. Sam, however, despised Gollum upon sight, and often warned Frodo of the creature's deception and slipperiness.

When they reached the Black Gate and found it well-guarded, Gollum offered to lead them toward an alternative entrance into Mordor. Along the way, Frodo and Sam were seized by Faramir, and Gollum slipped away uncaught (but not unseen) and followed them. When Frodo allowed Faramir to briefly take Gollum prisoner in order to spare his life, Gollum felt betrayed, and began plotting against his new "master". Faramir found out that Gollum was taking them to the pass of Cirith Ungol, an entrance to Mordor through the Ephel Dúath mountains. He warned Frodo and Sam of the evil of that place, as well as the treachery he sensed in Gollum.

Frodo, Sam, and Gollum left Faramir and climbed the stairs to Cirith Ungol. Gollum slipped away and visited Shelob, planning to feed the hobbits to her and then get the Ring for himself when she was done. When he returned, he found the hobbits asleep, and the sight of Frodo sleeping nearly moved Gollum to repent. However, Sam woke up and spoke harshly to him, and the opportunity for redemption was lost.

Gollum followed through with his plan and led Frodo and Sam into Shelob's Lair. There, Frodo was stung by Shelob, taken prisoner by Orcs, and hauled to the Tower of Cirith Ungol. Sam rescued Frodo from the Tower of Cirith Ungol and, dressed in scavenged Orc-armour, the two made their way across the plateau of Gorgoroth to Mount Doom. When Frodo and Sam had almost reached their destination, Gollum attacked them, but Frodo threw him down. Sam faced Gollum on his own, letting Frodo continue up the mountain to finish their mission. Like Bilbo and Frodo before him, Sam spared Gollum's life out of pity, turned his back on the creature, and followed Frodo.

Moments later, Frodo stood on the edge of the Crack of Doom, but claimed the Ring for himself and put it on. Gollum struck, struggled with the invisible Frodo, bit off Frodo's finger, and seized the Ring. Gloating over his "prize" and dancing madly, he stepped over the edge and fell into the Crack of Doom, taking the Ring with him with a last cry of "Precious!" Thus, the Ring was destroyed and Sauron defeated. Sam cursed Gollum after his death, but Frodo urged his friend to forgive him, as without him the quest would have failed.

Characteristics 

In the first edition of The Hobbit, Tolkien made no reference to Gollum's size, leading illustrators such as Tove Jansson to portray him as very large. Tolkien realised the omission, and added in later editions that Gollum was "a small slimy creature." The Two Towers characterises him as slightly larger than Sam; and later, comparing him to Shelob, one of the Orcs describes him as "rather like a spider himself, or perhaps like a starved frog."

The Hobbit states that Gollum had pockets, in which he kept a tooth-sharpening-rock, goblin teeth, wet shells, and a scrap of bat wing; it describes him as having a thin face, "big round pale eyes", and being "as dark as darkness". In The Two Towers, rangers of Ithilien wonder if he is a tailless black squirrel. According to Sam in The Fellowship of the Ring, he had "paddle-feet, like a swan's almost, only they seemed bigger" when Gollum was following their boat by paddling a log down the River Anduin. In a manuscript written to guide illustrators to the appearance of his characters, Tolkien explained that Gollum had pale skin, but wore dark clothes and was often seen in poor light.

In The Fellowship of the Ring, Aragorn states that "his malice is great and gives him a strength hardly to be believed in one so lean and withered."
In The Two Towers, Gollum's grip is described as "soft, but horribly strong" as he wrestles with Sam.

Sam notes that Gollum has two distinct personalities: the sinister "Stinker" and the submissive "Slinker", with a green glint in his eyes showcasing the change between them. In "The Passage of the Marshes" chapter, Sam overhears a debate between the two, with the nefarious "Stinker" ultimately coming out on top. However, as shown in "The Stairs of Cirith Ungol" chapter, Gollum often oscillates between good and evil. When Gollum stumbles upon Frodo and Sam outside of Shelob's Lair, he is briefly overcome and nearly repents, but this is ultimately ruined by Sam's skeptical remarks. Tolkien describes this as the story's most tragic moment, and he claims "Sam failed to note the complete change in Gollum's tone and aspect. Gollum's repentance was blighted, Frodo's pity was wasted, and Shelob's Lair became inevitable."

Personality 

Tolkien describes Gollum's personality after he had been captured by Frodo and Sam:

Gollum hates everything Elf-made. In The Two Towers, Sam bound Gollum's neck with Elven rope, which caused Gollum excruciating pain by its mere presence. He was unable or unwilling to eat the lembas bread Sam and Frodo carried with them, and rejects cooked rabbit in favour of raw meat or fish.

Speech 

Gollum speaks in an idiosyncratic manner, often referring to himself in the third person, and frequently talks to himself. In The Hobbit, he always refers to himself as "my precious". When not referring to himself in the third person, he sometimes speaks of himself in the plural as "we", hinting at his alter ego. The rare occasions when he actually says "I" are interpreted by Frodo as an indication that Sméagol's better self has the upper hand. Gollum also uses his own versions of words similar to the original words. He usually adds -es to the end of a plural, resulting in words such as "hobbitses" instead of hobbits or "birdses" instead of birds. When forming the present tense of verbs, he frequently extends the third person singular ending -s to other persons and numbers, resulting in constructions like "we hates it" (by analogy with "he hates it"). Gollum's speech emphasises sibilants, often drawing them out.

Age 

Through the influence of the Ring, Gollum's life was extended far beyond that of other members of his clan. An average hobbit lifespan is over 100 years, but a span of 556 years separates Gollum's finding of the Ring and its destruction, by which time he was almost 600 years old.

Analysis

Sméagol and Déagol

Cain, Abel, and Grendel 

Commentators including the theologian Ralph C. Wood, and the critics Brent Nelson and Kathleen Gilligan, have remarked that Sméagol's murder of Déagol echoes Cain's killing of Abel in Genesis (4:1-18). Cain is jealous of his brother Abel; Sméagol is jealous of the shiny gold ring that his friend Déagol has found. Nelson observes that the names of the friends are similar, hinting that at least figuratively they are "brothers". Cain is guilty of Abel's murder, and ends up as a restless wanderer, never finding peace; Sméagol likewise is disowned and exiled by his family, and "wandered in loneliness". Nelson notes that Tolkien was a famed scholar of the Old English poem Beowulf, which he acknowledged was a major source of his own fiction; and that the Beowulf poet calls the monster Grendel one of the sons of Cain. Among the many parallels between Gollum and Grendel are their affinity for water, their isolation from society, and their bestial description.

The Tolkien scholar Verlyn Flieger suggests that Gollum is Tolkien's central monster-figure, likening him to both Grendel and the Beowulf dragon, "the twisted, broken, outcast hobbit whose manlike shape and dragonlike greed combine both the Beowulf kinds of monster in one figure".

Wagner's Der Ring des Nibelungen 

Jamie McGregor, writing in Mythlore, compares Sméagol's murder of Déagol to Fafner's murder of his brother Fasolt in Richard Wagner's . He notes that Tolkien denied any comparison of his Ring with Wagner's, and that this was accepted by his biographer Humphrey Carpenter. All the same, McGregor notes that Arthur Morgan identified evident parallels, starting with Alberich's curse: there is only one ring; it is cursed; it gives limitless power; owning it brings only misery, and it consumes its owner, who becomes its slave; its owner is called the Lord; owning it is living death.

McGregor further compares Déagol's delight in the ring with the Rhinemaidens' innocent rejoicing in their gold: "And behold! when he washed the mud away, there in his hand lay a beautiful golden ring; and it shone and glittered in the sun, so that his heart was glad". He draws a parallel between Sméagol's asking for the Ring with Fafner's; Déagol refuses, saying "I'm going to keep it", just as Fasolt says "I hold it: it belongs to me"; Sméagol derisively says "Oh, are you indeed, my love", and strangles him, turning by degrees into the wretched creature Gollum, while Fafner sourly says "Hold it fast in case it falls" and clubs Fasolt to death, becoming by degrees a treasure-fixated dragon.

Much later, Bilbo blunders into Gollum's cave and finds the Ring by accident; he holds off Gollum with his sword, and escapes by winning a peaceful battle, a riddle contest; Siegfried is led by Mime to the dragon's den, kills Fafner to save himself from being eaten; and takes the ring as a bird's voice suggests it. Alberich had cursed the "thief" who took the ring; Gollum curses Bilbo for taking his Ring. On the other hand, McGregor writes, Siegfried is a hero, Bilbo, an anti-hero; and the shrunken Mime is the most Gollum-like character in Wagner's Ring Cycle.

Psychological "pairing" with Frodo 

A variety of commentators have suggested that Gollum constitutes a "shadow figure" for Frodo, as his dark alter ego ("other self") according to Carl Jung's theory of psychological individuation. Some have identified many such "pairings", such as Denethor as a shadow for Théoden, Boromir for Aragorn, Saruman for Gandalf, Ted Sandyman for Sam Gamgee, the Barrow-wight for Tom Bombadil, and Shelob for Galadriel, but the Gollum/Frodo pairing is by far the most widely accepted.

Evil guide 

The Tolkien scholar Charles W. Nelson described Gollum as an evil guide, contrasted with Gandalf, the good guide (like Virgil in Dante's Inferno) in Lord of the Rings. He notes, too, that both Gollum and Gandalf are servants of The One, Eru Ilúvatar, in the struggle against the forces of darkness, and "ironically" all of them, good and bad, are necessary to the success of the quest.

Playing a part in a cosmic game 

David Callaway, writing in Mythlore, notes that Tolkien, a devout Roman Catholic, had made Middle-earth a place where good and evil are in conflict under an omnipotent god, Eru Ilúvatar: in other words, "his cosmology is Christian". Callaway describes Gollum as fitting into this framework as a being not wholly evil, able to make moral choices.

The Episcopal priest Fleming Rutledge writes that at the Council of Elrond, Frodo angrily resists the notion that Gollum was a Hobbit like himself. She adds that Gandalf describes the tale of Gollum's enslavement to the Ring as "a sad story" rather than as Frodo's description of him, "loathsome". Gandalf says that Gollum "had no will left in the matter", and could not get rid of the Ring; instead, "the Ring itself .. decided things". Rutledge comments that the sad story has happened to everybody, trapped, as Christians believe, in "Sin and Death", and states that

 
Eru makes use of every being's choices for good: Callaway gives as example the way that Gríma Wormtongue's angry throwing of the palantír, a crystal ball-like stone of seeing, enables Pippin Took to look in the stone and reveal himself to Sauron; in turn, Sauron jumps to a wrong conclusion about the stone and the hobbit, which assists the Fellowship in completing their quest, destroying the One Ring. Similarly, Callaway argues, Gollum "is being partly manipulated by Eru in this cosmic chess game" citing Gandalf's remark that Gollum "has some part to play yet, for good or ill". Indeed, Gollum's alter ego, Sméagol, struggles to be good, speaks the truth when questioned by Frodo, and guides them through the Dead Marshes. In short, as Tolkien writes, Gollum is "not altogether wicked". Finally, at the end of the quest inside Mount Doom, Gollum takes the Ring from Frodo, and causes it to be destroyed, completing the quest successfully at the moment that Frodo had announced that he would keep the Ring. Callaway calls this "the ultimate heroic self-sacrifice", arguing that Gollum acted "consciously" using "the good fraction in his mind finally overpowering the Ring's evil".

Degenerate 

English literature scholars William N. Rogers II and Michael R. Underwood compare Gollum to the similarly named evil and ancient hag Gagool in Rider Haggard's 1885 novel King Solomon's Mines; Tolkien acknowledged Haggard, especially his novel She, as a major influence. They note that Haggard's tales share many motifs with Tolkien's The Hobbit, including a non-heroic narrator who turns out to be brave and capable in a crisis; a group of male characters on a quest; dangers in caves; a goal of treasure; and return to a happy countryside. Gollum and Gagool both have a monstrous character, Gagool being described as

Rogers and Underwood note that Gagool rejoices in "blood and death". Like Gollum, she is human-like but distorted to a parody; she is shrunken and extremely old; her large eyes and speech are distinctive; and she is wholly materialistic, with a "terrible greediness and self-referencing" and "the insatiable claims of the naked ego". They mention also the cultural background of the late 19th century, combining economic recession, fear of moral decline and degeneration leading indeed to eugenics, and a "for-the-moment hedonism" in the face of these concerns. They comment that Gagool can be seen as a "worst-case" embodiment of such Victorian era fears.

Dale Nelson, writing in the J. R. R. Tolkien Encyclopedia, suggests that Gollum may derive from H. G. Wells's Morlocks in his 1895 novel The Time Machine. They have "dull white" skin with a "bleached look", "strange large grayish-red eyes" with "a capacity for reflecting light", and run in a low posture somewhere close to all fours, looking like "a human spider", through having lived for generations underground in darkness.

Tom Birkett, writing in A Companion to J. R. R. Tolkien, likens Gollum to Hreiðmarr's son in the Völsunga saga, who took the shape of an otter to catch fish; in the myth, the gods pay a ring as ransom when they kill the otter. Birkett comments on the resemblance to Gollum of "this semi-aquatic creature, greedily devouring fish in a mountain pool".

A 2004 paper in the British Medical Journal by supervised students at University College London argued that Gollum meets seven of the nine diagnostic criteria for schizoid personality disorder.

Adaptations

Animations 

Gollum's first known screen adaptation is in Gene Deitch's 1967 short film The Hobbit, where his role is reduced to a scene depicting him sitting in his boat.

In the 1977 Rankin/Bass adaptation of The Hobbit and its 1980 The Return of the King, Gollum was voiced by Brother Theodore. He appeared somewhat froglike.

In Ralph Bakshi's 1978 animated film adaptation of The Lord of the Rings, as in the 1981 BBC radio dramatisation, Gollum was voiced by Peter Woodthorpe. Austin Gilkeson, writing on TOR.com, called the prologue with the "snaring and transformation of Gollum" "beautifully rendered as black shadows cast against a red canvas" like a shadow play or a medieval tapestry come to life, with a mix of animation, painted backgrounds, and rotoscoping.

Television plays 

In the Soviet-era television film Сказочное путешествие мистера Бильбо Бэггинса, Хоббита (The Fairytale Journey of Mr. Bilbo Baggins, The Hobbit) of 1985, a green-faced Gollum is portrayed by Igor Dmitriev.

A different Russian Gollum was played by Viktor Smirnov in Leningrad Television's two-part 1991 TV play Khraniteli, rediscovered in 2021. Variety reported that "he's speaking Russian, sports orange eye-shadow and has what appears to be bright green cabbage leaves pasted to his head."

Kari Väänänen portrayed Gollum in the 1993 live-action television miniseries Hobitit [The hobbits] produced and broadcast by the Finnish network Yle.

Feature films 

In Peter Jackson's The Lord of the Rings film trilogy, Gollum is a CGI character voiced and performed by actor Andy Serkis. He is smaller than both Frodo and Sam, but still has considerable strength and agility. Barely glimpsed in The Lord of the Rings: The Fellowship of the Ring (2001), he becomes a central character in The Lord of the Rings: The Two Towers (2002) and The Lord of the Rings: The Return of the King (2003). The CGI character was built around Serkis's facial features, voice, and acting choices, and is depicted naked but for a loincloth. Serkis based the iconic "gollum" throat noise on the sound of his cat coughing up hairballs. Using a digital puppet created by Jason Schleifer and Bay Raitt at Weta Digital, animators created Gollum's performance using a mixture of motion capture data recorded from Serkis and the traditional animation process of key frame, along with the laborious process of digitally rotoscoping Serkis's image and replacing it with the digital Gollum's in a technique coined rotoanimation.

In The Lord of the Rings: The Return of the King, Serkis himself appears in a flashback scene as Sméagol before his degeneration into Gollum. This scene was originally earmarked for The Two Towers, but was held back because the screenwriters felt audiences would relate better to the original Sméagol once they were more familiar with who he became. The decision to include this scene meant that Raitt and Jamie Beswarick had to redesign Gollum's face for the second and third films so that it would more closely resemble Serkis'. Serkis once again played Gollum in the 2012 prequel film The Hobbit: An Unexpected Journey. In Jackson's films, Gollum has a split personality: the childlike "Sméagol" and the evil "Gollum". Screenwriters Fran Walsh and Philippa Boyens included scenes in The Two Towers, The Return of the King and An Unexpected Journey in which "Gollum" and "Sméagol" argue, with Serkis slightly altering his voice and body language to play the two as separate entities. This style was praised by the Tolkien scholar Tom Shippey who described the Jackson interpretation as "masterful" and the additional scenes as "especially good".

Serkis and Gollum appeared on the 2003 MTV Movie Awards, when Gollum won "Best Virtual Performance" and went on to deliver an obscenity-laden acceptance speech in character, so well received that it won the Hugo Award for Best Dramatic Presentation, Short Form. Wizard magazine rated Jackson's Gollum as the 62nd-greatest villain of all time, from among 100 villains from film, television, comics and video games. In addition, Serkis as Gollum was placed thirteenth on Empire magazine's "100 Greatest Movie Characters of all Time".

Fan film 

Gollum is the eponymous character in The Hunt for Gollum, an independently produced 2009 prequel to the Jackson films directed by Chris Bouchard. Bouchard's CGI Gollum, voiced by Gareth Brough, looks much like the Gollum of the Jackson films.

Other media 

In Canada, Gollum was portrayed by Michael Therriault in the three-hour stage production of The Lord of the Rings, which opened in 2006 in Toronto. He won a Dora Award for the performance.

Gollum appears in a 1989 three-part comic book adaptation of The Hobbit, scripted by Chuck Dixon and Sean Deming and illustrated by David Wenzel.

The Lord of the Rings: Gollum, a video game centered on Gollum, is currently under development by Daedalic Entertainment.

Cultural references

The band Led Zeppelin mention Gollum and Mordor in their 1969 song "Ramble On", with the lyrics "Twas in the darkest depths of Mordor / I met a girl so fair / But Gollum, and the evil one crept up / And slipped away with her".

In 1973, a genus of ground sharks was named Gollum by the taxonomist Leonard Compagno, who noted that the slender smooth-hound "bears some resemblance in form and habits" to the Tolkien character.
In 1992, a genus of intertidal sea slugs was named Smeagol in reference to the original name of the Tolkien character.
In 2006, a species of dipluran was named Gollumjapyx smeagol.
In 2015, a species of cave-dwelling harvestmen was named Iandumoema smeagol. 
In 2016 a new species, the precious stream toad, Ansonia smeagol, was described from Malaysia; the specific epithet was chosen for the toad's "long thin limbs and bulbous eyes".

See also 

 Erdoğan–Gollum comparison trials

References

Primary
This list identifies each item's location in Tolkien's writings.

Secondary

Sources

External links 

 Tolkien website of Harper Collins (the British publisher)
 Tolkien website of Houghton Mifflin  (the American publisher)

Middle-earth Hobbits
Characters in The Hobbit
The Lord of the Rings characters
Animated characters
Male literary villains
Male film villains
Bearers of the One Ring
Literary characters introduced in 1937
Adventure film characters
Fictional murderers
Fictional illeists
Fictional characters with schizoid personality disorder
Middle-earth monsters
Animated characters in film